The PFL 7 mixed martial arts event for the 2022 season of the Professional Fighters League was held on August 5, 2022, at the Hulu Theater in New York City, New York, United States. This event marked the start of the playoffs for the Light Heavyweight and Lightweight divisions.

Background 
This event featured the semifinal bouts of the Light Heavyweight and Lightweight playoffs. 

Rob Wilkinson and Delan Monte will face each other in the Light Heavyweight division. Wilkinson made his third appearance with PFL cage, going 2-0 in the regular season with a first and second round stoppages. Monte was 1-1 during the regular season in 2022. The other side of the bracket was to see two former UFC veterans, Antônio Carlos Júnior and Omari Akhmedov, face off against each other. However, Antonio suffered an ACL injury requiring surgery, sidelining him for the rest of the year and he was replaced by Josh Silveira for the playoffs.

The Lightweight bracket saw former UFC Champion Anthony Pettis take on UFC vet Stevie Ray in a rematch of their bout six weeks earlier, while Olivier Aubin-Mercier and Alex Martinez faced off in the other lightweight semifinal.

Results

2022 PFL Light Heavyweight playoffs

Antônio Carlos Júnior was originally scheduled to face Omari Akhmedov but was unable to continue in the tournament. He was replaced by #5 ranked Josh Silveira.

2022 PFL Lightweight playoffs

See also 

 List of PFL events
 List of current PFL fighters

References 

2022 in sports in New York City
Professional Fighters League
2022 in mixed martial arts
August 2022 sports events in the United States
Sporting events in New York City
Mixed martial arts events